Fox Forest Wildlife Management Area (WMA) is located south of Elkins, West Virginia in Randolph County.  It is located along the Tygart Valley River and is adjacent to the West Virginia Division of Natural Resources' Elkins Operations Center.

See also

Animal conservation
Hunting
fishing
List of West Virginia wildlife management areas

References

External links
West Virginia DNR District 4 Wildlife Management Areas
West Virginia hunting regulations
West Virginia Fishing Regulations

Wildlife management areas of West Virginia
Protected areas of Randolph County, West Virginia